Pamba may refer to:

 Pamba (king), a king of the Hatti in the early 22nd century BC
 Pamba River, Kerala, India
 INS Pamba, a self-propelled water carrier barge
 Pamba, a synonym for Psoralis, a genus of grass skipper butterflies
 Aminomethylbenzoic acid, a protease inhibitor and antifibrinolytic agent
 Bryan Pamba (born 1992), French basketball player
 Saleh Pamba (born 1950), Tanzanian politician
 Pamba S.C., is a Tanzanian football club based in Mwanza

See also
 Mini Pamba, Malappuram, a halting stations for pilgrims in Kerala, India